The terraforming of Venus or the terraformation of Venus is the hypothetical process of engineering the global environment of the planet Venus in order to make it suitable for human habitation. Adjustments to the existing environment of Venus to support human life would require at least three major changes to the planet's atmosphere:
 Reducing Venus's surface temperature of 
 Eliminating most of the planet's dense  carbon dioxide and sulfur dioxide atmosphere via removal or conversion to some other form
 The addition of breathable oxygen to the atmosphere. 
These three changes are closely interrelated because Venus's extreme temperature is due to the high pressure of its dense atmosphere and the greenhouse effect.

History of the idea
Poul Anderson, a successful science fiction writer, had proposed the idea in his 1954 novelette "The Big Rain", a story belonging to his Psychotechnic League future history. 

The first known suggestion to terraform Venus in a scholarly context was by the astronomer Carl Sagan in 1961,

Prior to the early 1960s, the atmosphere of Venus was believed by many astronomers to have an Earth-like temperature. When Venus was understood to have a thick carbon dioxide atmosphere with a consequence of a very large greenhouse effect, some scientists began to contemplate the idea of altering the atmosphere to make the surface more Earth-like. This hypothetical prospect, known as terraforming, was first proposed by Carl Sagan in 1961, as a final section of his classic article in the journal Science discussing the atmosphere and greenhouse effect of Venus. Sagan proposed injecting photosynthetic bacteria into the Venus atmosphere, which would convert the carbon dioxide into reduced carbon in organic form, thus reducing the carbon dioxide from the atmosphere.

The knowledge of Venus's atmosphere was still inexact in 1961, when Sagan made his original proposal. Thirty-three years after his original proposal, in his 1994 book Pale Blue Dot, Sagan conceded his original proposal for terraforming would not work because the atmosphere of Venus is far denser than was known in 1961:
"Here's the fatal flaw: In 1961, I thought the atmospheric pressure at the surface of Venus was a few bars ... We now know it to be 90 bars, so if the scheme worked, the result would be a surface buried in hundreds of meters of fine graphite, and an atmosphere made of 65 bars of almost pure molecular oxygen.  Whether we would first implode under the atmospheric pressure or spontaneously burst into flames in all that oxygen is open to question.  However, long before so much oxygen could build up, the graphite would spontaneously burn back into CO2, short-circuiting the process."

Following Sagan's paper, there was little scientific discussion of the concept until a resurgence of interest in the 1980s.

Proposed approaches to terraforming
A number of approaches to terraforming are reviewed by Martyn J. Fogg (1995) and by Geoffrey A. Landis (2011).

Eliminating the dense carbon dioxide atmosphere

The main problem with Venus today, from a terraformation standpoint, is the very thick carbon dioxide atmosphere. This also, through the greenhouse effect, causes the temperature on the surface to be several hundred degrees too hot for any significant organisms. Therefore, all approaches to the terraforming of Venus include somehow removing almost all the carbon dioxide in the atmosphere.

Biological approaches
The method proposed in 1961 by Carl Sagan involves the use of genetically engineered algae to fix carbon into organic compounds. Although this method is still proposed in discussions of Venus terraforming, later discoveries showed that biological means alone would not be successful.

Difficulties include the fact that the production of organic molecules from carbon dioxide requires  hydrogen, which is very rare on Venus. Because Venus lacks a protective magnetosphere, the upper atmosphere is exposed to direct erosion by the solar wind and has lost most of its original hydrogen to space. And, as Sagan noted, any carbon that was bound up in organic molecules would quickly be converted to carbon dioxide again by the hot surface environment. Venus would not begin to cool down until after most of the carbon dioxide had already been removed.

Although it is generally conceded that Venus could not be terraformed by introduction of photosynthetic biota alone, use of photosynthetic organisms to produce oxygen in the atmosphere continues to be a component of other proposed methods of terraforming.

Capture in carbonates

On Earth nearly all carbon is sequestered in the form of carbonate minerals or in different stages of the carbon cycle, while very little is present in the atmosphere in the form of carbon dioxide. On Venus, the situation is the opposite. Much of the carbon is present in the atmosphere, while comparatively little is sequestered in the lithosphere. Many approaches to terraforming therefore focus on getting rid of carbon dioxide by chemical reactions trapping and stabilising it in the form of carbonate minerals.

Modelling by astrobiologists Mark Bullock and David Grinspoon of Venus's atmospheric evolution suggests that the equilibrium between the current 92-bar atmosphere and existing surface minerals, particularly calcium and magnesium oxides, is quite unstable, and that the latter could serve as a sink of carbon dioxide and sulfur dioxide through conversion to carbonates. If these surface minerals were fully converted and saturated, then the atmospheric pressure would decline and the planet would cool somewhat. One of the possible end states modelled by Bullock and Grinspoon was a  atmosphere and  surface temperature. To convert the rest of the carbon dioxide in the atmosphere, a larger portion of the crust would have to be artificially exposed to the atmosphere to allow more extensive carbonate conversion. In 1989, Alexander G. Smith proposed that Venus could be terraformed by lithosphere overturn, allowing crust to be converted into carbonates.  Landis 2011 calculated that it would require the involvement of the entire surface crust down to a depth of over 1 km to produce enough rock surface area to convert enough of the atmosphere.

Natural formation of carbonate rock from minerals and carbon dioxide is a very slow process. Recent research into sequestering carbon dioxide into carbonate minerals in the context of mitigating global warming on Earth however points out that this process can be considerably accelerated (from hundreds or thousands of years to just 75 days) through the use of catalysts such as polystyrene microspheres. It could therefore be theorised that similar technologies might also be used in the context of terraformation on Venus. It can also be noted that the chemical reaction that converts minerals and carbon dioxide into carbonates is exothermic, in essence producing more energy than is consumed by the reaction. This opens up the possibility of creating self-reinforcing conversion processes with potential for exponential growth of the conversion rate until most of the atmospheric carbon dioxide can be converted.

Bombardment of Venus with refined magnesium and calcium from off-world could also sequester carbon dioxide in the form of calcium and magnesium carbonates.

Injection into volcanic basalt rock
Research projects in Iceland and the US state of Washington have shown that potentially large amounts of carbon dioxide could be removed from the atmosphere by high-pressure injection into subsurface porous basalt formations, where carbon dioxide is rapidly transformed into solid inert minerals.

Other studies predict that one cubic meter of porous basalt has the potential to sequester 47 kilograms of injected carbon dioxide. According to these estimates a volume of about 9.86 × 109 km3 of basalt rock would be needed to sequester all the carbon dioxide in the Venusian atmosphere. This is equal to the entire crust of Venus down to a depth of about 21.4 kilometers. Another study concluded that under optimal conditions, on average, 1 cubic meter of basalt rock can sequester 260 kg of carbon dioxide. The surface is about 90% basalt, and about 65% consists of a mosaic of volcanic lava plains. There should therefore be ample volumes of basalt rock strata on the planet with very promising potential for carbon dioxide sequestration.

Research has also demonstrated that under the high temperature and high pressure conditions in the mantle, silicon dioxide, the most abundant mineral in the mantle (on Earth and probably also on Venus) can form carbonates that are stable under these conditions. This opens up the possibility of carbon dioxide sequestration in the mantle.

Introduction of hydrogen
According to Birch, bombarding Venus with hydrogen and reacting it with carbon dioxide could produce elemental carbon (graphite) and water by the Bosch reaction. It would take about 4 × 1019 kg of hydrogen to convert the whole Venusian atmosphere, and such a large amount of hydrogen could be obtained from the gas giants or their moons' ice. Another possible source of hydrogen could be somehow extracting it from possible reservoirs in the interior of the planet itself. According to some researchers, the Earth's mantle and/or core might hold large quantities of hydrogen left there since the original formation of Earth from the nebular cloud.  Since the original formation and inner structure of Earth and Venus are generally believed to be somewhat similar, the same might be true for Venus.

Iron aerosol in the atmosphere will also be required for the reaction to work, and iron can come from Mercury, asteroids, or the Moon. (Loss of hydrogen due to the solar wind is unlikely to be significant on the timescale of terraforming.) Due to the planet's relatively flat surface, this water would cover about 80% of the surface, compared to 70% for Earth, even though it would amount to only roughly 10% of the water found on Earth.

The remaining atmosphere, at around 3 bars (about three times that of Earth), would mainly be composed of nitrogen, some of which will dissolve into the new oceans of water, reducing atmospheric pressure in accordance with Henry's law. To further reduce the pressure even more, nitrogen could also be fixated into nitrates.

Futurist Isaac Arthur has suggested using the hypothesized processes of starlifting and stellasing to create a particle beam of ionized hydrogen from the sun, tentatively dubbed a "hydro-cannon". This device could be used both to thin the dense atmosphere of Venus, but also to introduce hydrogen to react with carbon dioxide to create water, thereby further lowering the atmospheric pressure.

Direct removal of atmosphere
The thinning of the Venusian atmosphere could be attempted by a variety of methods, possibly in combination. Directly lifting atmospheric gas from Venus into space would probably prove difficult. Venus has sufficiently high escape velocity to make blasting it away with asteroid impacts impractical. Pollack and Sagan calculated in 1994 that an impactor of 700 km diameter striking Venus at greater than 20 km/s, would eject all the atmosphere above the horizon as seen from the point of impact, but because this is less than a thousandth of the total atmosphere and there would be diminishing returns as the atmosphere's density decreases, a very great number of such giant impactors would be required. Landis calculated that to lower the pressure from 92 bar to 1 bar would require a minimum of 2,000 impacts, even if the efficiency of atmosphere removal was perfect. Smaller objects would not work, either, because more would be required. The violence of the bombardment could well result in significant outgassing that would replace removed atmosphere. Most of the ejected atmosphere would go into solar orbit near Venus, and, without further intervention, could be captured by the Venerian gravitational field and become part of the atmosphere once again.

Another variant method involving bombardment would be to perturb a massive Kuiper belt object to put its orbit onto a collision path with Venus. If the object, made of mostly ices, had enough velocity to penetrate just a few kilometers past the Venusian surface, the resulting forces from the vaporization of ice from the impactor and the impact itself could stir the lithosphere and mantle thus ejecting a proportional amount of matter (as magma and gas) from Venus. A byproduct of this method would be either a new moon for Venus or a new impactor-body of debris that would fall back to the surface at a later time.

Removal of atmospheric gas in a more controlled manner could also prove difficult. Venus's extremely slow rotation means that space elevators would be very difficult to construct because the planet's geostationary orbit lies an impractical distance above the surface, and the very thick atmosphere to be removed makes mass drivers useless for removing payloads from the planet's surface. Possible workarounds include placing mass drivers on high-altitude balloons or balloon-supported towers extending above the bulk of the atmosphere, using space fountains, or rotovators.

In addition, if the density of the atmosphere (and corresponding greenhouse effect) were dramatically reduced, the surface temperature (now effectively constant) would probably vary widely between day side and night side. Another side effect to atmospheric-density reduction could be the creation of zones of dramatic weather activity or storms at the terminator because large volumes of atmosphere would undergo rapid heating or cooling.

Cooling planet by solar shades
Venus receives about twice the sunlight that Earth does, which is thought to have contributed to its runaway greenhouse effect. One means of terraforming Venus could involve reducing the insolation at Venus's surface to prevent the planet from heating up again.

Space-based
Solar shades could be used to reduce the total insolation received by Venus, cooling the planet somewhat. A shade placed in the Sun–Venus  Lagrangian point also would serve to block the solar wind, removing the radiation exposure problem on Venus.

A suitably large solar shade would be four times the diameter of Venus itself if at the  point. This would necessitate construction in space. There would also be the difficulty of balancing a thin-film shade perpendicular to the Sun's rays at the Sun–Venus Lagrangian point with the incoming radiation pressure, which would tend to turn the shade into a huge solar sail. If the shade were simply left at the  point, the pressure would add force to the sunward side and the shade would accelerate and drift out of orbit. The shade could instead be positioned nearer to the Sun, using the solar pressure to balance the gravitational forces, in practice becoming a statite.

Other modifications to the  solar shade design have also been suggested to solve the solar-sail problem. One suggested method is to use polar-orbiting, solar-synchronous mirrors that reflect light toward the back of the sunshade, from the non-sunward side of Venus. Photon pressure would push the support mirrors to an angle of 30 degrees away from the sunward side.

Paul Birch proposed a slatted system of mirrors near the  point between Venus and the Sun. The shade's panels would not be perpendicular to the Sun's rays, but instead at an angle of 30 degrees, such that the reflected light would strike the next panel, negating the photon pressure. Each successive row of panels would be +/- 1 degree off the 30-degree deflection angle, causing the reflected light to be skewed 4 degrees from striking Venus.

Solar shades could also serve as solar power generators. Space-based solar shade techniques, and thin-film solar sails in general, are only in an early stage of development. The vast sizes require a quantity of material that is many orders of magnitude greater than any human-made object that has ever been brought into space or constructed in space.

Atmospheric or surface-based

Venus could also be cooled by placing reflectors in the atmosphere. Reflective balloons floating in the upper atmosphere could create shade. The number and/or size of the balloons would necessarily be great. Geoffrey A. Landis has suggested that if enough floating cities were built, they could form a solar shield around the planet, and could simultaneously be used to process the atmosphere into a more desirable form, thus combining the solar shield theory and the atmospheric processing theory with a scalable technology that would immediately provide living space in the Venusian atmosphere. If made from carbon nanotubes or graphene (a sheet-like carbon allotrope), then the major structural materials can be produced using carbon dioxide gathered in situ from the atmosphere. The recently synthesised amorphous carbonia might prove a useful structural material if it can be quenched to Standard Temperature and Pressure (STP) conditions, perhaps in a mixture with regular silica glass. According to Birch's analysis, such colonies and materials would provide an immediate economic return from colonizing Venus, funding further terraforming efforts.

Increasing the planet's albedo by deploying light-colored or reflective material on the surface (or at any level below the cloud tops) would not be useful, because the Venerian surface is already completely enshrouded by clouds, and almost no sunlight reaches the surface. Thus, it would be unlikely to be able to reflect more light than Venus's already-reflective clouds, with Bond albedo of 0.77.

Combination of solar shades and atmospheric condensation
Birch proposed that solar shades could be used to not merely cool the planet but to also reduce atmospheric pressure as well, by the process of freezing of the carbon dioxide. Below that temperature, freezing of atmospheric carbon dioxide into dry ice will cause it to deposit onto the surface. He then proposed that the frozen CO2 could be buried and maintained in that condition by pressure, or even shipped off-world (perhaps to provide greenhouse gas needed for terraforming of Mars or the moons of Jupiter). After this process was complete, the shades could be removed or solettas added, allowing the planet to partially warm again to temperatures comfortable for Earth life. A source of hydrogen or water would still be needed, and some of the remaining 3.5 bar of atmospheric nitrogen would need to be fixed into the soil. Birch suggests disrupting an icy moon of Saturn, for example Hyperion, and bombarding Venus with its fragments.

Cooling planet by heat pipes, atmospheric vortex engines or radiative cooling

Paul Birch suggests that, in addition to cooling the planet with a sunshade in L1, "heat pipes" could be built on the planet to accelerate the cooling. The proposed mechanism would transport heat from the surface to colder regions higher up in the atmosphere, similar to a solar updraft tower, thereby facilitating radiation of excess heat out into space. A newly proposed variation of this technology is the atmospheric vortex engine, where instead of physical chimney pipes, the atmospheric updraft is achieved through the creation of a vortex, similar to a stationary tornado. In addition to this method being less material intensive and potentially more cost effective, this process also produces a net surplus of energy, which could be utilised to power venusian colonies or other aspects of the terraforming effort, while simultaneously contributing to speeding up the cooling of the planet. Another method to cool down the planet could be with the use of radiative cooling This technology could utilise the fact that in certain wavelengths, thermal radiation from the lower atmosphere of Venus can "escape" to space through partially transparent atmospheric “windows” – spectral gaps between strong CO2 and H2O absorption bands in the near infrared range . Nanophotonics and construction of metamaterials opens up new possibilities to tailor the emittance spectrum of a surface via properly designing periodic nano/micro-structures.
Recently there has been proposals of a device named a "emissive energy harvester" that can transfer heat to space through radiative cooling and convert part of the heat flow into surplus energy, opening up possibilities of a self-replicating system that could exponentially cool the planet.

Introduction of water
Since Venus has only a fraction of the water of Earth (less than half the Earth's water content in the atmosphere, and none on the surface), water would have to be introduced either by the aforementioned method of introduction of hydrogen, or from some other intraplanetary or extraplanetary source.

Capture the Ice Moons
Paul Birch suggests the possibility of colliding Venus with one of the ice moons from the outer solar system, thereby bringing in all the water needed for terraformation in one go. This could be achieved through gravity assisted capture of Saturn's moons Enceladus and Hyperion or the Uranian moon Miranda. Simply changing the velocity of these moons enough to move them from their current orbit and enable gravity-assisted transport to Venus would require large amounts of energy. However, through complex gravity-assisted chain reactions the propulsion requirements could be reduced by several orders of magnitude. As Birch puts it, "[t]heoretically one could flick a pebble into the asteroid belt and end up dumping Mars into the Sun."

Outgassing from the mantle
Studies have shown that substantial amounts of water (in the form of hydrogen) might be present in the mantle of terrestrial planets. It has therefore been speculated that it would be technically possible to extract this water from the mantle to the surface even if no feasible method to accomplish this exists currently.

Altering day–night cycle
Venus rotates once every 243 Earth days—by far the slowest rotation period of any known object in the Solar System. A Venusian sidereal day thus lasts more than a Venusian year (243 versus 224.7 Earth days). However, the length of a solar day on Venus is significantly shorter than the sidereal day; to an observer on the surface of Venus, the time from one sunrise to the next would be 116.75 days. Therefore, the slow Venerian rotation rate would result in extremely long days and nights, similar to the day-night cycles in the polar regions of earth — shorter, but global. The slow rotation might also account for the lack of a significant magnetic field.

Arguments for keeping the current day-night cycle unchanged
It has until recently been assumed that the rotation rate or day-night cycle of Venus would have to be increased for successful terraformation to be achieved. More recent research has shown, however, that the current slow rotation rate of Venus is not at all detrimental to the planet's capability to support an Earth-like climate. Rather, the slow rotation rate would, given an Earth-like atmosphere, enable the formation of thick cloud layers on the side of the planet facing the sun. This in turn would raise planetary albedo and act to cool the global temperature to Earth-like levels, despite the greater proximity to the Sun. According to calculations, maximum temperatures would be just around 35 °C (95 °F), given an Earth-like atmosphere. Speeding up the rotation rate would therefore be both impractical and detrimental to the terraforming effort. A terraformed Venus with the current slow rotation would result in a global climate with "day" and "night" periods each roughly 2 months (58 days) long, resembling the seasons at higher latitudes on Earth. The "day" would resemble a short summer with a warm, humid climate, a heavy overcast sky and ample rainfall. The "night" would resemble a short, very dark winter with quite cold temperature and snowfall. There would be periods with more temperate climate and clear weather at sunrise and sunset resembling a "spring" and "autumn".

Space mirrors
The problem of very dark conditions during the roughly two-month long "night" period could be solved through the use of a space mirror in a 24-hour orbit (the same distance as a geostationary orbit on Earth) similar to the Znamya (satellite) project experiments. Extrapolating the numbers from those experiments and applying them to Venerian conditions would mean that a space mirror just under 1700 meters in diameter could illuminate the entire nightside of the planet with the luminosity of 10-20 full moons and create an artificial 24-hour light cycle. An even bigger mirror could potentially create even stronger illumination conditions. Further extrapolation suggests that to achieve illumination levels of about 400 lux (similar to normal office lighting or a sunrise on a clear day on earth) a circular mirror about 55 kilometers across would be needed.

Paul Birch suggested keeping the entire planet protected from sunlight by a permanent system of slated shades in L1, and the surface illuminated by a rotating soletta mirror in a polar orbit, which would produce a 24-hour light cycle.

Changing rotation speed
If increasing the rotation speed of the planet would be desired (despite the above-mentioned potentially positive climatic effects of the current rotational speed), it would require energy of a magnitude many orders greater than the construction of orbiting solar mirrors, or even than the removal of the Venerian atmosphere. Birch calculates that increasing the rotation of Venus to an Earth-like solar cycle would require about 1.6 × 1029 Joules (50 billion petawatt-hours).

Scientific research suggests that close flybys of asteroids or cometary bodies larger than 100 kilometres (60 mi) across could be used to move a planet in its orbit, or increase the speed of rotation. The energy required to do this is large. In his book on terraforming, one of the concepts Fogg discusses is to increase the spin of Venus using three quadrillion objects circulating between Venus and the Sun every 2 hours, each traveling at 10% of the speed of light.

G. David Nordley has suggested, in fiction, that Venus might be spun up to a day length of 30 Earth days by exporting the atmosphere of Venus into space via mass drivers. A proposal by Birch involves the use of dynamic compression members to transfer energy and momentum via high-velocity mass streams to a band around the equator of Venus. He calculated that a sufficiently high-velocity mass stream, at about 10% of the speed of light, could give Venus a day of 24 hours in 30 years.

Creating an artificial magnetosphere
Protecting the new atmosphere from the solar wind, to avoid the loss of hydrogen, would require an artificial magnetosphere. Venus presently lacks an intrinsic magnetic field, therefore creating an artificial planetary magnetic field is needed to form a magnetosphere via its interaction with the solar wind. According to two NIFS Japanese scientists, it is feasible to do that with current technology by building a system of refrigerated latitudinal superconducting rings, each carrying a sufficient amount of direct current.

In the same report, it is claimed that the economic impact of the system can be minimized by using it also as a planetary energy transfer and storage system (SMES). Another study proposes the possibility of deployment of a magnetic dipole shield at the L1 Lagrange point, thereby creating an artificial magnetosphere that would protect the whole planet from solar wind and radiation.

See also
 Terraforming
 Colonization of Venus
 Terraforming of Mars
 Space sunshade

References

External links
 Visualizing the steps of solar system terraforming
 A fictional account of the terraformation of Venus
 Terraform Venus (discussion on the New Mars forum)
 Terraforming Venus - The Latest Thinking (discussion on the New Mars forum)

Planetary engineering
Space colonization
Venus
Venus